The Appalachian Stakes is a Grade III American Thoroughbred horse race for three-year-old fillies over a distance of one mile (8 furlongs) on the turf held annually in early April at Keeneland Race Course, Lexington, Kentucky during the spring meeting. The event currently offers a purse of $400,000.

History

The Appalachian Stakes was named for the Appalachian Mountains which extend into Eastern Kentucky.

The event was inaugurated on 7 April 1989 and was won by the Christiana Stables owned To the Lighthouse, in a time of 1:46 over the  miles distance. The event was run at this distance until 1995.

The event was upgraded to Grade III event in 2008 and in 2018 to Grade II.

Records
Speed  record
 1:33.97 – Enola Gay (2020)
 
Margins
 6 lengths – White Corners  (1992)

Most wins by an owner
 2 – Brereton C. Jones (1993, 2010)
 2 – Team Valor (2002, 2007)

Most wins by a jockey
 4 – Pat Day (1991, 1993, 2000, 2002)

Most wins by a trainer
 3 – Chad C. Brown (2012, 2015, 2018)
 3 – Todd A. Pletcher (2003, 2007, 2021)
 3 – H. Graham Motion (2010, 2014, 2022)

Winners

See also 
 List of American and Canadian Graded races

External links 
 2015 Keeneland Media Guide

References

1989 establishments in Kentucky
Keeneland horse races
Flat horse races for three-year-old fillies
Turf races in the United States
Graded stakes races in the United States
Grade 2 stakes races in the United States
Recurring sporting events established in 1989